Ade Aruna (born April 27, 1994) is a Nigerian professional American football defensive end for the BC Lions of the Canadian Football League (CFL). He played college football at Tulane, and was drafted by the Minnesota Vikings in the sixth round of the 2018 NFL Draft. He has also been a member of the Oakland / Las Vegas Raiders.

Early life
Born in Nigeria, Aruna moved to the United States during his high school years, initially to pursue a career in basketball.

Professional career

Minnesota Vikings
Aruna was drafted by the Minnesota Vikings in the sixth round (218th overall) of the 2018 NFL Draft. On August 20, 2018, he was placed on injured reserve after suffering a knee injury in the preseason.

Aruna was waived/injured during final roster cuts on August 31, 2019, and reverted to the team's injured reserve list the next day. He was waived from injured reserve with an injury settlement on September 12.

Oakland / Las Vegas Raiders
On December 26, 2019, Aruna was signed to the Oakland Raiders' practice squad. On December 30, 2019, Aruna was signed to a reserve/future contract. On July 27, 2020, he was waived with a non-football injury designation. He was re-signed on August 8, 2020. Aruna was waived once again on August 25, 2020.

BC Lions
Aruna signed with the BC Lions of the CFL on April 19, 2021. He was placed on the suspended list on July 2, 2021.

References

1994 births
Living people
American football defensive ends
BC Lions players
Minnesota Vikings players
Nigerian emigrants to the United States
Nigerian players of American football
La Lumiere School alumni
Las Vegas Raiders players
Oakland Raiders players
People from Akure
People from La Porte, Indiana
Players of American football from Indiana
Tulane Green Wave football players